Scirpophaga xanthogastrella is a moth in the family Crambidae. It was described by Francis Walker in 1863. It is found in Taiwan, India, Nepal, Sri Lanka and the Philippines.

The wingspan is 22–30 mm for males and 27–36 mm for females. The forewings and hindwings of the males are pale ochreous white and those of the females are white with an ochreous-yellow anal tuft.

The larvae possibly feed on Tripidium arundinaceum (syn. Saccharum arundinaceum) and Saccharum spontaneum, but these records may be based on a misindentification.

References

Moths described in 1863
Schoenobiinae
Moths of Asia